In abstract algebra, the Weyl algebra is the ring of differential operators with polynomial coefficients (in one variable), namely expressions of the form

More precisely, let F be the underlying field, and let F[X] be the ring of polynomials in one variable, X, with coefficients in F.  Then each fi lies in F[X].

∂X is the derivative with respect to X.  The algebra is generated by X and ∂X.

The Weyl algebra is an example of a simple ring that is not a matrix ring over a division ring.  It is also a noncommutative example of a domain, and an example of an Ore extension.

The Weyl algebra is isomorphic to the quotient of the free algebra on two generators, X and Y, by the ideal generated by the element

The Weyl algebra is the first in an infinite family of algebras, also known as Weyl algebras.  The n-th Weyl algebra, An, is the ring of differential operators with polynomial coefficients in n variables.  It is generated by Xi and ∂Xi, .

Weyl algebras are named after Hermann Weyl, who introduced them to study the Heisenberg uncertainty principle in quantum mechanics.  It is a quotient of the universal enveloping algebra of the Heisenberg algebra, the Lie algebra of the Heisenberg group, by setting the central element of the Heisenberg algebra (namely [X,Y]) equal to the unit of the universal enveloping algebra (called 1 above).

The Weyl algebra is also referred to as the symplectic Clifford algebra. Weyl algebras represent the same structure for symplectic bilinear forms that Clifford algebras represent for non-degenerate symmetric bilinear forms.

Generators and relations 
One may give an abstract construction of the algebras An in terms of generators and relations. Start with an abstract vector space V (of dimension 2n) equipped with a symplectic form ω. Define the Weyl algebra W(V) to be

where T(V) is the tensor algebra on V, and  the notation  means "the ideal generated by".

In other words, W(V) is the algebra generated by V subject only to the relation .

Quantization 
The algebra W(V) is a quantization of the symmetric algebra Sym(V).  If V is over a field of characteristic zero, then W(V) is naturally isomorphic to the underlying vector space of the symmetric algebra Sym(V) equipped with a deformed product – called the Groenewold–Moyal product (considering the symmetric algebra to be polynomial functions on V∗, where the variables span the vector space V, and replacing iħ  in the Moyal product formula with 1).

The isomorphism is given by the symmetrization map from Sym(V) to W(V)

If one prefers to have the iħ and work over the complex numbers, one could have instead defined the Weyl algebra above as generated by Xi and iħ∂Xi  (as per quantum mechanics usage).

Thus, the Weyl algebra is a quantization of the symmetric algebra, which is essentially the same as the Moyal quantization (if for the latter one restricts to polynomial functions), but the former is in terms of generators and relations (considered to be differential operators) and the latter is in terms of a deformed multiplication.

In the case of exterior algebras, the analogous quantization to the Weyl one is the Clifford algebra, which is also referred to as the orthogonal Clifford algebra.

Properties of the Weyl algebra

In the case that the ground field  has characteristic zero, the nth Weyl algebra is a simple Noetherian domain.  It has global dimension n, in contrast to the ring it deforms, Sym(V), which has global dimension 2n.

It has no finite-dimensional representations. Although this follows from simplicity, it can be more directly shown by taking the trace of σ(X) and σ(Y) for some finite-dimensional representation σ (where ).

Since the trace of a commutator is zero, and the trace of the identity is the dimension of the representation, the representation must be zero dimensional.

In fact, there are stronger statements than the absence of finite-dimensional representations.  To any finitely generated An-module M, there is a corresponding subvariety Char(M) of  called the 'characteristic variety' whose size roughly corresponds to the size of M (a finite-dimensional module would have zero-dimensional characteristic variety).  Then Bernstein's inequality states that for M non-zero,

Positive characteristic
The situation is considerably different in the case of a Weyl algebra over a field of characteristic .

In this case, for any element D of the Weyl algebra, the element Dp is central, and so the Weyl algebra has a very large center.  In fact, it is a finitely generated module over its center; even more so, it is an Azumaya algebra over its center.  As a consequence, there are many finite-dimensional representations which are all built out of simple representations of dimension p.

Constant center 
The center of Weyl algebra is the field of constants. Thus  is a constant.

Generalizations 
For more details about this quantization in the case n = 1 (and an extension using the Fourier transform to a class of integrable functions larger than the polynomial functions), see Wigner–Weyl transform.

Weyl algebras and Clifford algebras admit a further structure of a *-algebra, and can be unified as even and odd terms of a superalgebra, as discussed in CCR and CAR algebras.

Affine varieties 
Weyl algebras also generalize in the case of algebraic varieties. Consider a polynomial ring

This can be described explicitly as the quotient ring

See also

 Jacobian conjecture
 Dixmier conjecture

References

  (Classifies subalgebras of the one-dimensional Weyl algebra over the complex numbers; shows relationship to SL(2,C))
 
 
 

Algebras
Differential operators
Ring theory